Pirivom Santhippom is a 2011 Indian Tamil-language soap opera that aired Monday through Friday on Vijay TV from 4 April 2011 to 4 May 2012 at 7:30PM (IST) for 272 episodes. Its initial concept is an adaptation from North Indian Hindi serial Sapna Babul Ka...Bidaai that was aired on Star Plus.

The show starred Kalyani, Rachitha Mahalakshmi, Syed Anwar Ahmed, Dinesh Gopalasamy, Anuradha Krishnamoorthy and among others. It was director by Rashool.  This is a story of two childhood friends Revathy (Kalyani) and Jyothi (Rachitha Mahalakshmi) explores the social impacts of skin colour.

Plot
Revathy (Kalyani) who is treated as a step daughter in the family by her aunt Dhanam (Rajalakshmi), Jothi's mother and is targeted because of her beauty. Jothi (Rachitha Mahalakshmi) gets criticised of her dark complexion and her marriage gets delayed because of her appearance. Amidst all the differences and partialities, Revathy and Jothi stay close to each other. The beautiful friendship breaks due to multiple factors when Revathy marries Prabhu (Syed Anwar Ahmed), a psychologically affected guy for the sake of her family. Unfortunate events happen and finally Jyothi's marriage with Karthik (Dinesh Gopalasamy), death of Shanmugaraja and Revathy accused of his death. Revathy endures the evil plans of Abirami (Anuradha Krishnamoorthy) and brings Prabhu back to normal life by her persistent effort and belief in him.

Cast

Main cast
 Poornitha as Revathy 
 is the daughter of Shanmugaraja's sister who has lost her parents at young age and is raised by him. She is a very pretty girl and is loved by Shanmugaraja like his own daughter
 Rachitha Mahalakshmi as Jyothi
 is their beloved daughter who is a very active and fun loving girl, but she is often commented upon because of her dark complexion
 Syed Anwar Ahmed as Prabhu  
 Dinesh Gopalsamy as Karthik

Additional cast

Awards and nominations

References

External links
Official website
Star Vijay on Youtube
Official website

Star Vijay original programming
Tamil-language romance television series
Tamil-language television series based on Hindi-language television series
2011 Tamil-language television series debuts
Tamil-language television shows
2012 Tamil-language television series endings
2012 Tamil-language television seasons